Club Deportivo As Pontes is a football team based in As Pontes in the autonomous community of Galicia. Founded in 1960, it plays in the Tercera División – Group 1. Its stadium is O Poboado with a capacity of 2,000 seats.

History
Club Deportivo As Pontes was founded in 1960 as Club de Fútbol Calvo Sotelo.

CD As Pontes names
Club de Fútbol Calvo Sotelo - (1960–1969)
Club Deportivo As Pontes - (1969–1984)
Endesa As Pontes Club de Fútbol - (1984–2001)
Club Deportivo As Pontes - (2001–)

Season to season

9 seasons in Segunda División B
20 seasons in Tercera División

Honours
Tercera División: 1986–87, 1994–95

Famous players
 Manuel Carou
 Santiago Miguélez
 Quico
 Repi
 David Rochela
 Piscu

References
Official website 
Futbolme.com profile 

Football clubs in Galicia (Spain)
Association football clubs established in 1960
Endesa
1960 establishments in Spain